Tomoya Okawa (born January 3, 1993) is a wushu taolu athlete from Japan. He is a one-time world champion, and multiple-time medalist at the World Wushu Championships and the Taolu World Cup.

Career 
Okawa started training wushu at the age of ten. He originally just practiced taijiquan, but eventually switched to modern changquan and later to jianshu and qiangshu in 2012. Okawa's international debut was at the 2013 World Wushu Championships in Kuala Lumpur, Malaysia, where he became the world champion in men's jianshu. He also won a silver medal in qiangshu. Two years later, Okawa competed in the 2015 World Wushu Championships and won a bronze medal in qiangshu. His high placements in changquan and jianshu qualified him to compete in three events at the 2016 Taolu World Cup in Fuzhou, China, where he won a gold medal in qiangshu and a silver medal in jianshu. That same year, he also won a silver medal in jianshu at the Asian Wushu Championships in Taoyuan, Chinese Taipei. A year later, Tomoya suffered a major ACL injury during training, but was able to compete and place high in the 2017 World Wushu Championships. He then went on to win silver medals in jianshu and qiangshu at the 2018 Taolu World Cup in Yangon, Myanmar.

References

External links 

 Tomoya Okawa on Twitter
 Tomoya Okawa on Instagram

1993 births
Living people
People from Ebetsu, Hokkaido
Japanese wushu practitioners
Chuo University alumni